Harry Ahluwalia also known as G.Ahluwalia (born 8 February 1983) is an Indian actor. Harry Ahluwalia made his silver screen film debut as a lead actor from Punjabi film Veeran Naal Sardari  released on 17 January 2014. He started his career as a model, but turned to acting since 2006 and as his reputation grew, he got the chance to star as the leading actor in his first short film, Vadhde Kadam, directed by Munish Sharma. After that, Harry played the lead role in his second short film, Kaal Chakar, with the same director. He has been living abroad and working for an Australian production. These days he has been working with Soul Creative Australian.

Personal life
Harry was born in Pathankot in family where nobody had a film background. His father, Paramjit Singh, was a dairy development inspector in Punjab and his mother, Paramjit Kaur, was a house wife. Ahluwalia has an elder sister and a younger brother living in Australia. According to news papers and other sources, Ahluwalia was quite different from others even in his childhood. He didn't mix well with other kids, hated going out in public places, and always had leadership qualities which allowed him to stand out from thousands of people in a crowd.

Filmography

Videography

References

External links
 Harry Ahluwalia Biography
 Harry Ahluwalia IMDb

External links 

Fan page on facebook
Harry Ahluwalia official page on Twitter
Harry Ahluwalia official page on Instagram
Harry Ahluwalia official Youtube
Harry Ahluwalia official page on TikTok

Indian male film actors
Living people
1983 births
Indian Sikhs
People from Pathankot district
Ahluwalia